No Joke! is the ninth studio album by the Meat Puppets. The album was released on October 3, 1995, by London Records. It was the follow-up to the band's album Too High to Die and was the last Meat Puppets album with bassist Cris Kirkwood (until his reunion on 2007's Rise to Your Knees) and drummer Derrick Bostrom (until 2019's Dusty Notes). A video was filmed for the song "Scum", directed by Dave Markey.

Artwork 
The cover art "no joke" used on the album was originally created by Curt Kirkwood's daughter, which the band chose to use as the album's title and cover art.

Music 
In September 2000, Al Shipley wrote that No Joke! had a "droning alt-metal sensibility".

Reception 

Stephen Thomas Erlewine of AllMusic described No Joke! as an "average" Meat Puppets record, explaining that although the songs were "competent", it lacked the "wild spark" and "bizarre sense of humour" that characterised their 1980s work.

Eric Flaum of American music publication Rolling Stone was more praising, awarding the album 4-out-of-5 stars and stating that No Joke! showed the band's creativity at "full throttle".

Track listing
All songs written by Curt Kirkwood, unless otherwise noted.

Personnel
Meat Puppets
 Derrick Bostrom - drums, paintings
 Cris Kirkwood - bass, vocals, illustrations
 Curt Kirkwood - guitar, vocals, paintings
Technical
 Paul Leary - producer

Chart performance
Album - Billboard (North America)

References

1995 albums
Meat Puppets albums
London Records albums
Albums produced by Paul Leary
Grunge albums